A Kokou is one of the most highly feared warrior Undergods in the traditional religion of Benin.

One who fails to respect the Kokou during a ceremonial trance may have a sacred calabash placed on their head until it becomes excessively heavy.

References

Bibliography
 

Beninese culture
Yoruba gods
Dahomean gods
Voodoo gods
War gods